Kangxiwar is the location of a deserted town on the southwest side of the Kunlun Mountains.  It is on the bank of the Karakash River in the western Xinjiang Uyghur Autonomous Region of the People's Republic of China. It is also the base of the route to Hotan from the Karakash valley via the Hindutash pass. According to Chinese sources, Kangxiwar means "place with mine" in Uyghur.

During the Sino-Indian War of 1962, Kangxiwar served as the forward headquarters for the Xinjiang Military Command. The military cemetery of those killed in the war is still located here. There is also a highway maintenance crew house at Kangxiwar at the present time.  China National Highway 219 (G219), the Xinjiang-Tibet Highway, runs through here. Following the G219 southeast will lead to Dahongliutan and Tianshuihai, the latter of which is in Aksai Chin. China National Highway 580 is under construction connecting Kangxiwar directly with Hotan. It is scheduled to be completed in 2022.

History

Before modern era, the area was a thoroughfare of the caravan trade route between Leh and Tarim Basin. The Hindutash Pass, a historical mountain pass through the Kunlun Mountains is just north of here. This place was previously referred to as Sumgal. Literally meaning "three fords" in Tibetic languages, it was a historical ford along with caravan camp. The caravan camp which had a shed was located slightly downstream to the west on the north bank of the Karakash River Another camp Ak-Koom was located slightly upstream to the east at the joining of two valleys.

During the 1860s at the time of Dungan Revolt, lawlessness led to the valley being frequented by Kyrgyz robbers who would capture caravans and sell the caravaners into slavery in Badakshan. A fort was set up by the princely state of Jammu and Kashmir (part of the British Indian Empire) downstream near Xaidulla to help protect the caravans.

By the 1930s, it was recorded by European travelers that a settlement of Kyrgyz nomads was located at Kangxiwar.

Sino-Indian war 
During the 1962 Sino-Indian War, the PLA's Xinjiang Military Command set up the forward headquarters for its operations in the western sector (Aksai Chin) at Kangxiwar.  It was commanded by the Deputy Commander-in-Chief of the Xinjiang Military Command. The 2nd Infantry Regiment of Xinjiang was stationed here and controlled the bases at Tianwendian, Heweitan, Kongka Pass and in Ngari.
Certain activities were supervised directly by PLA General Staff Department. The Chinese soldiers who perished during the Indo-China war were buried at a military cemetery in Kangxiwar along the G219 highway. The cemetery contains the graves of over 100 PLA soldiers.

See also
 Aksai Chin
 Dahongliutan
 Karakash River

Notes

References

Bibliography
 

Populated places in Xinjiang
Hotan Prefecture